"Jacaranda" is a song recorded by Spanish singer Bad Gyal featuring American producer Dubbel Dutch. It was released by Puro Records, Rare Earth Tones and Canada Editorial on 26 May 2017. It was written by Bad Gyal and Dubbel Dutch, and produced by the latter. Fact named it as their number 1 single of 2017.

Music video
The accompanying music video for "Jacaranda" was released along with the song on 26 May 2017 on Bad Gyal's YouTube channel. The video was produced by Canada, and directed by Alexis Gómez. It was filmed at the April Fair in Barcelona, Spain.

Release history

References

2017 singles
2017 songs
Bad Gyal songs
Music videos shot in Spain
Songs about dancing
Spanglish songs